Kayian Awan Patti    is a small village situated in Awan Patti valley, Muzaffarabad District, Azad Kashmir.

References

Populated places in Muzaffarabad District